The Edson Cemetery is a cemetery located in Lowell, Massachusetts, at 1375 Gorham Street.

Overview
Edson Cemetery was opened as a public burial ground by the city of Lowell in 1846. It was named in honor of Rev. Theodore Edson, who was minister of the St. Anne's Church on Merrimack Street. It has over 10,000 lot owners, and is the largest of Lowell's cemeteries.

The grave of American author Jack Kerouac, at the center of section 94, is a frequent stop for tourists and readers who often leave mementos like candles, pens, cigarettes, and their own poetry.

Notable burials
 Jack Kerouac, novelist
 John C. McFarland, Medal of Honor recipient, Civil War
 William Preston Phelps, painter
 Joseph Taylor, Medal of Honor recipient, Civil War

References

1846 establishments in Massachusetts
Buildings and structures completed in 1846
Buildings and structures in Lowell, Massachusetts
Cemeteries in Middlesex County, Massachusetts
Tourist attractions in Lowell, Massachusetts